The Canada U-17 women's national soccer team is a youth soccer team operated under the Canadian Soccer Association.  Its primary role is the development of players in preparation for the senior national team.  The team's most recent major tournament was the 2018 CONCACAF Women's U-17 Championship, which was postponed after Canada had played one match due to civil unrest in Nicaragua. Following the resumption of the tournament, Canada placed third and qualified for the 2018 FIFA U-17 Women's World Cup.

History
At the 2008 FIFA U-17 Women's World Cup, Canada advanced out of group stage where they were defeated by Germany in the quarterfinals. Canada won the 2010 CONCACAF Women's U-17 Championship after beating Mexico in the final, but were eliminated at group stage of the 2010 FIFA U-17 Women's World Cup. At the 2012 FIFA U-17 Women's World Cup, Canada matched their best appearance, dropping their quarterfinal game to North Korea.

Bev Priestman took over duties from Bryan Rosenfeld in 2013 to direct the new Women's Excel Program (U-14/U-17). Priestman previously assisted Canada's senior coach, John Herdman, when both coached in the New Zealand women's program. Qualifying second out of CONCACAF, Canada was drawn into the "group of death" at the 2014 FIFA U-17 Women's World Cup with European champions Germany, African champions Ghana, and Asian runners-up North Korea. Canada tied their first two games and secured a quarterfinal birth by defeating group winners Ghana in the final group stage game. Canada lost their quarterfinal match 3–2 to Venezuela.

Fixtures and results
Legend

2022

Players

Current roster
The following 20 players were called up for the 2022 CONCACAF Women's U-17 Championship.

Previous squads
2013 CONCACAF Women's U-17 Championship
2014 FIFA U-17 Women's World Cup
2016 CONCACAF Women's U-17 Championship
2016 FIFA U-17 Women's World Cup
2018 CONCACAF Women's U-17 Championship
2018 FIFA U-17 Women's World Cup

Competitive record

FIFA World Cup

CONCACAF Championship

See also

 Canada women's national under-20 soccer team
 Soccer in Canada

References

National youth sports teams of Canada
Women's national under-17 association football teams